Nunzio is a 1978 American drama film directed by Paul Williams and written by James Andronica. The film stars David Proval, James Andronica, Morgana King, Joe Spinell, Tovah Feldshuh and Maria Smith. The film was released on May 10, 1978, by Universal Pictures.

Plot
Nunzio Sabatino (David Proval) is a grown man with the demeanor of a young child. He lives at home with his doting mother (Morgana King) and has a job as a bicycle delivery man for Angelo (Joe Spinell), the neighborhood grocer, which Angelo provides as a favor for Nunzio's brother Jamesie (James Andronica). Nunzio is fixated on elements of superhero stories; he wears sweatshirts that he has emblazoned with a shield and a capital "N" in the style of Superman's shield, along with a cape, and often walks and jumps across his neighborhood's rooftops, stopping short of actually trying to fly. Younger children enjoy his company, particularly Georgie (Glenn Scarpelli), whom he suggests will one day have to take his place as neighborhood do-gooder. However, he is also constantly bullied by a gang of youths, led by JoJo (Vincent Russo), who enjoy ridiculing his dress and taking advantage of his diminished faculties.

In a series of vignettes, Nunzio undergoes challenges to his life. He becomes infatuated with Michelle (Tovah Feldshuh), an attractive employee at the local bakery, but when he expresses his affection for her, he is heartbroken to learn she is married with a child. He begins to refuse tips for delivering groceries, feeling that since Superman never asks for money for doing good things for people, neither should he, which worries his mother and brother. When delivering groceries to the home of Maryann (Theresa Saldana), JoJo's sometime girlfriend, she coerces him into having sex with her, which leaves them both feeling guilty and uncomfortable, a feeling which increases when Nunzio confesses it to his local priest and the priest replies with fiery rhetoric about punishment and Hell. Most of all, Nunzio despairs that he is burdening his mother with caring for him and his brother with defending him against the neighborhood bullies, and begins to neglect his job at Angelo's. After an argument with Jamesie, Nunzio decides to pack a bag and leave home.

As he walks the streets, Nunzio again encounters JoJo and his friends, who chase him into an apartment building's basement where he successfully hides and escapes from them. However, in their pursuit, the men inadvertently start a fire in the basement that quickly spreads. Nunzio, who is on the roof when the blaze erupts, descends the fire escape and knocks on every window he can to warn the residents to leave. Most everyone escapes, but Nunzio notices one resident who is still stuck in her apartment and passes out, and climbs back up to retrieve her; she is revealed to have leg braces. He carries her down, but is alerted by her that she has a sleeping child in the apartment, so he returns and collects the baby. By this time, he cannot get out the fire escape he came in from, and goes up the building stairs to the roof instead, which is too high for the fire department to reach with their ladder. He improvises swaddling from his jacket to wrap the child up, and ties the bundle to his back with a scrap of rope. Nunzio then leaps from the roof to a lower landing, falling on his chest, which allows the firemen to reach him and retrieve the child.

A few days later, Nunzio and his friends and family, including the woman and child he saved from the building, assemble on their building's stoop to pose for a photograph, holding the newspaper headline that describes him as "Superman."

Cast
 David Proval as Nunzio
 James Andronica as James "Jamesie"
 Morgana King as Mrs. Sabatino
 Joe Spinell as Angelo
 Tovah Feldshuh as Michelle
 Maria Smith as Carol Sabatino
 Vincent Russo as Joe "Jo-Jo"
 Jaime Alba as Bobby
 Theresa Saldana as Maryann
 Glenn Scarpelli as Georgie
 Tony Panetta as Georgie's Friend
 Steve Gucciardo as Carmine 
 Sonia Zomina as Mrs. Shuman
 Crystal Hayden as Crystal Sabatino
 Vincent Igneri as Vincent Sabatino
 Tom Quinn as Pete

References

External links
 

1978 films
1978 drama films
American drama films
Films scored by Lalo Schifrin
Films about intellectual disability
Films directed by Paul Williams
Films set in Brooklyn
Films shot in New York City
Universal Pictures films
1970s English-language films
1970s American films